William Dalrymple Maclagan (18 June 1826 – 19 September 1910) was Archbishop of York from 1891 to 1908, when he resigned his office, and was succeeded in 1909 by Cosmo Gordon Lang, later Archbishop of Canterbury. As Archbishop of York, Maclagan crowned Queen Alexandra in 1902.

Early life
Maclagan, the fifth son of a distinguished Scottish physician David Maclagan FRSE (1785–1865), was born in Edinburgh in 1826, and educated at the Royal High School. His elder brother was the surgeon and scholar Douglas Maclagan. He served five years in the Indian Army rising to the rank of lieutenant and resigning on grounds of ill health.

In 1852, he enrolled at Peterhouse, Cambridge, where he received a degree in mathematics four years later; he was made a deacon that year (1856) in London, and served in the Church of England thereafter; he was ordained priest in 1857. In 1869, he was Rector at Newington, and in 1875, he was Vicar of St Mary Abbots, Kensington; both parishes being in London. During this period, he composed several hymns. On 24 June 1878, he became Bishop of Lichfield, in the same year that he made a prestigious second marriage.

Bishop of Lichfield (1878–1891)

He was consecrated a bishop by Archibald Campbell Tait, Archbishop of Canterbury, on the Feast of the Nativity of Saint John the Baptist 1878 (24 June) at St Paul's Cathedral.

Archbishop of York (1891–1908)
In 1891 (possibly 28 July 1891), he was translated Archbishop of York, which position he held for the next seventeen years. He was appointed to the Privy Council after the accession of King Edward VII 24 January 1901. He made a private visit to Russia in 1897 and in the same year, he tried to create two new bishoprics, one in Sheffield. To do this, the Archbishop was prepared to surrender two thousand pounds of his considerable income – one thousand pounds for each new diocese, but the project still came to nothing. Maclagan complained that from 1891, he had been more Bishop than Archbishop owing to the large population and territory of the diocese. In 1906, he revived the idea, specifically naming Sheffield and Hull as the preferred seats for the new dioceses. By the end of his tenure, there were still only nine dioceses in the province. Sheffield did not get its own Bishop until 1914.

Maclagan was apparently a strong High Churchman, but his private beliefs had to be subsumed often. In 1899, he sat assessor with his ecclesiastical superior Frederick Temple, Archbishop of Canterbury (d. 1902), when the decision was given against the use of incense and other ritualistic practices, and was obliged loyally to uphold the primate's opinion.

Maclagan resigned his office in 1908, possibly on grounds of ill health. Archbishop Maclagan died in London on 19 September 1910, and was survived by his second wife Augusta (1826–1915).

Family
Maclagan was twice married. His first wife was Sarah Kate Clapham (1836–1864), whom he married in 1860 at the age of 34. By her he had two sons, Cyril and Walter.

He was married secondly on 12 November 1878 to the Honourable Augusta Anne Barrington (1836–1915), a daughter of the daughter of the William Barrington, 6th Viscount Barrington.
(Augusta Maclagan had money settled upon her when she married Maclagan, then Bishop of Lichfield, in 1878; for the sources of this money and how it was invested, see this paper. About half her money was settled upon her son Eric when he married in 1913. Thus, the Archbishop's wife, son and daughter-in-law all had independent means, necessary to preserve their social status.). By his second wife, he had a son Eric (1879–1951), and a daughter Theodora "Dora" Maclagan (1881–1976).

His eldest son Cyril died childless. His second son, Walter Dalrymple Maclagan (1862–1929), had a son William Dalrymple Maclagan, schoolmaster, and a daughter, Evelyn Maclagan, physician, both of whom apparently died unmarried. His third and youngest son, Eric Maclagan (1879–1951) married in 1913 and left two sons, Michael Maclagan (1914–2003), herald and historian; and Gerald Maclagan (d. 1942, killed in action), who had been working in Rhodesian Railways. His posterity is represented by the three surviving children of Michael Maclagan.

Maclagan was the younger brother of Professor Sir Douglas Maclagan, MD, otherwise known as Andrew Douglas Maclagan (1812–1900) and Sir Douglas, also educated at the Royal High School in Edinburgh, was a fellow of the Royal College of Surgeons of Edinburgh, 1833 and was knighted in 1886. He was a correspondent of Charles Darwin. Another brother was General Sir Robert Maclagan FRSE KCMG R.E. (1820–1893). The artist Philip Douglas Maclagan (1901–1972) is descended from an older brother.

Royal connections
He baptised Princess Mary of York later Countess of Harewood, on 7 June 1897 at St Mary Magdalene's Church near Sandringham House. She was the only daughter of George V. Curiously, her husband, George Lascelles, 7th Earl of Harewood, would be a cousin of his future daughter-in-law Helen Lascelles. Maclagan, as Archbishop of York, was possibly chosen to christen the new royal princess because her parents were then Duke and Duchess of York.

In 1902 he crowned Alexandra of Denmark, wife of Edward VII, as Queen of the United Kingdom.

Hymns
Hymns composed by Maclagan include:
"The Saints of God! their conflict past", 1869 first appeared in Church Bells (lyrics, or here)
"It is finished! blessed Jesus" (music and lyrics here)
"Palms of glory, raiment bright", date not known.

Works
Written works by Maclagan include:
Frederick Temple and William Dalrymple Maclagan. "Answer of the Archbishops of Canterbury and York to the Bull Apostolicae Curae of H. H. Leo XIII" (on English Ordinations), dated circa 1897
 William Dalrymple Maclagan. Hymns and Hymn Tunes by the late Archbishop MacLagan, printed for use in York Minster, etc. by William Dalrymple Maclagan (1915)
 William Dalrymple Maclagan Archbishop of York on reservation of Sacrament (1900)

References

Sources

Images
Maclagan's portrait can be seen here, and here.
 A younger man as Lord Bishop of Lichfield, between 1878 and 1891.
Images at the National Portrait Gallery

Further reading
 How, Frederick Douglas. Archbishop Maclagan: Being a Memoir of the Most Reverend the Right Honourable William Dalrymple Maclagan, D.D.,Archbishop of York and Primate of England London: W. Gardner and Darton, 1911.
 Notes and Queries 1930 CLIX: 47, inputs by his son Eric Maclagan, H.M. Cashmore, and C. Roy Huddleston

External links

1826 births
1910 deaths
19th-century Scottish Episcopalian priests
People educated at the Royal High School, Edinburgh
Clergy from Edinburgh
British East India Company Army officers
Anglo-Scots
Alumni of Peterhouse, Cambridge
Bishops of Lichfield
Archbishops of York
19th-century Anglican archbishops
20th-century Anglican archbishops
Members of the Privy Council of the United Kingdom